The 2015 Dhivehi Premier League was the first season of the Dhivehi Premier League, the top division of Maldivian football. The season began on 20 April 2015. The league was made up of the 8 clubs that broke away from the Dhivehi League at the end of the 2014 season.

New league sponsors
From the start of the 2015 season, the Dhivehi Premier League was sponsored by Ooredoo Maldives.

Teams
A total of 8 teams will be contesting in the league, including 7 sides from the 2014 Dhivehi League season and one promoted from the 2014 Second Division Football Tournament.

Teams and their divisions
Note: Table lists clubs in alphabetical order.

Personnel and kits

Note: Flags indicate national team as has been defined under FIFA eligibility rules. Players may hold more than one non-FIFA nationality.

Coaching changes

Foreign players

League table
Format: In Round 1 and 2, all eight teams play against each other. Teams with most total points after Round 2 are crowned the Dhivehi Premier League champions and qualify for the AFC Cup. The top four teams qualify for the POMIS Cup & President's Cup.

Standings of round 1

Standings of round 2

Final standings

Season summary

Result table

Positions by round
The table lists the positions of teams after each week of matches.

Matches

Round 1
A total of 28 matches will be played in this round.

Round 2
A total of 28 matches will be played in this round.

Season statistics

Scoring
 First goal: Viliam Macko for New Radiant against Victory (19th minute, 22:19 UTC+05:00) (20 April 2015)
 Fastest goal: 
 Largest winning margin:
 Highest scoring game:
 Most goals scored in a match by a single team:
 Most goals scored in a match by a losing team:

Top scorers

Hat-tricks

 4 Player scored four goals

Clean sheets

Player

Club
 Most clean sheets:
 Fewest clean sheets:

Discipline

Player
Most yellow cards:
Most red cards: 1
Rilwan Waheed (New Radiant)

Club

Most yellow cards:
Most red cards: 1
New Radiant

2016 Dhivehi Premier League play-off

The play-off were to be played between 7th placed team in 2015 Dhivehi Premier League, B.G. Sports Club and 2015 Second Division runner up team. Since recreation clubs of government offices are not allowed in the Football Association of Maldives first division football tournaments, the play-off spot was given to the fourth placed Club Green Streets. 2015 Second Division runner-ups were Police Club while Dhivehi Sifainge Club were third in the league table.

References

Dhivehi Premier League seasons
Maldives
Maldives
1